The Primetime Emmy Award for Outstanding Picture Editing for a Structured Reality or Competition Program is awarded to one program each year. This category and Outstanding Picture Editing for an Unstructured Reality Program were created in 2016, replacing Outstanding Picture Editing for Reality Programming. Prior to 2006, reality programs competed alongside nonfiction programs in Picture Editing for a Nonfiction Program.

In the following list, the first titles listed in gold are the winners; those not in gold are nominees, which are listed in alphabetical order. The years given are those in which the ceremonies took place:

Winners and nominations

2000s
Outstanding Picture Editing for a Structured or Competition Reality Program

2010s

Outstanding Picture Editing for a Structured or Competition Reality Program

2020s

Programs with multiple wins

3 wins
 RuPaul's Drag Race

2 wins
 Queer Eye

Programs with multiple nominations
Totals include nominations for Outstanding Picture Editing for Reality Programming and Outstanding Picture Editing for a Nonfiction Program.

19 nominations
 Survivor

16 nominations
 The Amazing Race

11 nominations
 Project Runway

7 nominations
 Top Chef

6 nominations
 RuPaul's Drag Race

5 nominations
 Queer Eye

4 nominations
 The Voice

3 nominations
 Shark Tank

2 nominations
 RuPaul's Drag Race All Stars

References

Picture Editing for a Structured or Competition Reality Program